Magnetic Fantasies was an American gaming magazine first published in February 1981, and published by Magnetic Fantasies, edited and published by Claude Plum, Richard Koch, and Arnett Taylor. The magazine was published bimonthly and headquartered in Los Angeles, California.

Contents
Magnetic Fantasies was a publication devoted to the art of Computerized Fantasy Simulations, its goal to cover the ever growing field of computer RPGs.

Reception
Bruce F. Webster reviewed Magnetic Fantasies in The Space Gamer No. 43. Webster commented that "Recommendation: look before you buy, and buy only if there is some information in there worth the cost of the magazine.  I realize they're just starting ... but I don't remember the early Space Gamers being this bad."

References

External links
 Magnetic Fantasies 1981

Bimonthly magazines published in the United States
Defunct computer magazines published in the United States
Magazines established in 1981
Magazines published in California
Magazines with year of disestablishment missing
Video game magazines published in the United States